R-ace GP is an auto racing team from France, involved in many areas of motorsport, specifically those involving Renault. They are currently competing in the Formula Regional European Championship, Italian F4 and ADAC F4.

History
R-ace GP was founded in 2011 by Thibaut de Merindol and Cyril Comte. They partook in the Eurocup and NEC championships of Formula Renault 2.0. Their driver line-up included Norman Nato, Pieter Schothorst and Côme Ledogar. In its first year of Formula Renault 2.0, the team scored eighth in the Eurocup championship, with Nato taking two podiums, and ninth in NEC, with Nato and Ledogar taking podiums.

In 2012, the team entered with a line-up of Andrea Pizzitola, Red Bull Junior Pierre Gasly and the McLaren-backed Nyck de Vries. The team climbed up to fifth in both standings, with de Vries taking the team's maiden victory in the NEC championship.

The following year, the team formed a close collaboration with ART Grand Prix and was renamed the ART Junior Team. Pizzitola remained with Alexandre Baron, Nico Jamin, Tanart Sathienthirakul, Alberto di Folco and Esteban Ocon joining the team. The team finished runners-up to Tech 1 Racing in the Eurocup standings, with Ocon achieving third place in the driver's standings.

In 2014, the team went forth with a new line-up of Aurélien Panis, Callan O'Keefe, Levin Amweg and Simon Gachet. The team achieved fourth place in both championships with wins from Amweg, O'Keefe and Panis. The following year, Max Defourny, Ukyo Sasahara, Darius Oskoui and Will Palmer (Eurocup only) formed the team's 2015 line-up. The team finished as runners-up to Josef Kaufmann Racing in the NEC championship, with Sasahara and Defourny claiming wins and spots in the top five in the overall standings, and sixth in Eurocup.

In 2016, it was announced that the R-ace GP name would return. Defourny and Palmer remained with the team and were joined by newcomer Julien Falchero and Marcus Armstrong in a guest drive. In the championships, the team repeated their feat of 2015 in NEC and claimed third place in Eurocup, with Defourny finishing in the top three of the driver's standings.

In 2017, Palmer and Defourny were contracted to the team for a third season with Robert Shwartzman and Italian F4 driver Raúl Guzman joining the team. For the 2017 NEC Championship, the team signed three drivers from the 2016 French F4 Championship, vice champion Gilles Magnus, third-place finisher Michael Benyahia and race winner Théo Coicaud with karting champion Charles Milesi making his single-seater debut with the team.

In 2018, R-ace GP puts his title back on the line with a new line-up. Max Fewtrell and Victor Martins, both in the Renault Sport Academy, Logan Sargeant and Charles Milesi continued in Eurocup. In the NEC championship, Gabriel Gandulia joins the team.

For the 2019 season, the team signed returnees Oscar Piastri and Aleksandr Smolyar and reigning French F4 champion and Renault junior Caio Collet. R-ace GP also expanded into the ADAC Formula 4 Championship, fielding Gregoire Saucy and László Tóth. The team will also take part in 3 meetings of Italian F4 Championship. The team won the triple crown in Eurocup that season: teams' title for the 3rd year in a row, rookie title with Caio Collet and drivers' title with Australian Oscar Piastri with 7 wins and 320 points.

In July 2019, it was announced R-ace GP would expand into the Toyota Racing Series, collaborating with MTEC Motorsport for the 2020 season.

Current series results

Italian F4 Championship

† Giovanni Maschio raced for AS Motorsport for thirteen races in 2022.

Formula Regional European Championship

In detail 
(key) (Races in bold indicate pole position) (Races in italics indicate fastest lap)

Formula 4 UAE Championship

Formula Regional Asian Championship

Formula Regional Middle East Championship

Former series results

Formula Renault 2.0 NEC

caRenault Sport Trophy 

† Guest driver (ineligible for points)

Eurocup Formula Renault 2.0

† Guest driver (ineligible for points)

Toyota Racing Series

ADAC Formula 4

† Kirill Smal raced for Prema Powerteam for nine races in 2020.

Timeline

References

External links
 
 Renault-Sport Official website
 Northern European Cup
 Formula Renault

French auto racing teams
Auto racing teams established in 2011
2011 establishments in France
Formula Renault Eurocup teams
Formula Regional European Championship teams